Indian singer Diljit Dosanjh has released 13 studio albums, one extended plays and 41 singles. In 2020, he entered the Social 50 chart by Billboard, following the release of his 11th album G.O.A.T. The album also entered the top 20 in the Canadian Albums Chart. His 12th album MoonChild Era charted at number 32 on the Canadian Albums Chart.

Studio albums

Extended plays

Singles

As lead artist

As featured artist

Soundtrack contributions

Punjabi

Hindi

As executive producer

References

Discographies of Indian artists
Pop music discographies
Hip hop discographies
Contemporary R&B discographies
Rhythm and blues discographies